Story is an unincorporated community in Sioux County, Nebraska, United States.

History
A post office was established at Story in 1891, and remained in operation until it was discontinued in 1935. The community was named for Solomon R. Story, an early postmaster.

References

Unincorporated communities in Sioux County, Nebraska
Unincorporated communities in Nebraska